Baltal is a camping ground for pilgrims, 75 km from Ganderbal town in Ganderbal district of Jammu and Kashmir, India and 93 km from capital city Srinagar and 15 km north of Sonamarg on the Sind River at the base of Zojila pass. This little valley is only a day's journey away from Srinagar and provides a shorter high-altitude alternate route to the sacred cave of Amarnath.

Overview
  
The site is seen with pitched tents meant for the pilgrims to spend the night. Baltal is one hour away from Sonmarg on a taxi or a bus. It can also be reached from Pahalgam, 24 km away, in about 1 day by foot. For hikers, it takes around one day to reach Baltal from Pahalgam.   

Renowned for its scenic beauty, Baltal meadows offers tent accommodation for the pilgrims and tourists alike  at reasonable prices. Both pony rides or, for those who can afford, helicopter services are available to the holy Amarnath Caves. Helicopter passengers have to disembark at Panjtarni and foot it, or take a pony ride, to the cave, 5 km away. For the hikers, the 14 km distance from Baltal to Amarnath takes about 4 hours on a winding steep trail. Basic teashops are available on route.

References

Geography of Jammu and Kashmir